Stanley William Bradshaw (16 January 1898 – 9 January 1980) was an English cricketer. Bradshaw was a right-handed batsman. He was born at Leicester, Leicestershire.

Bradshaw made his first-class debut for Leicestershire against Lancashire in the 1923 County Championship at Old Trafford. He made two further first-class appearances in that season's County Championship, against Gloucestershire and Sussex. He scored just 9 runs in his three matches with a high score of 5.

He died at Oadby, Leicestershire on 9 January 1980.

References

External links
Stanley Bradshaw at ESPNcricinfo
Stanley Bradshaw at CricketArchive

1898 births
1980 deaths
Cricketers from Leicester
English cricketers
Leicestershire cricketers